St. Henry High School is a public high school located in St. Henry, Ohio, United States. It is part of the St. Henry Consolidated Local Schools district. The school's teams are nicknamed the Redskins. The school is a member of the Midwest Athletic Conference.

Ohio High School Athletic Association State Championships
 Baseball – 1999, 2000, 2003
 Football – 1990, 1992, 1994, 1995, 2004, 2006
 Basketball – 1979, 1990, 1991, 2004
 Girls' Volleyball – 1985, 1987, 1990, 1994, 1995, 2004, 2011

Notable alumni
 Erica Gelhaus, Miss Ohio 2009
 Evan "Norm" Lefeld, former 40% 3 point shooter, Multiple Time Fantasy Football Champion
 Todd Boeckman, former Ohio State quarterback
 Jeff Hartings, former Penn State lineman, retired NFL center
 Bobby Hoying, former Ohio State quarterback, retired NFL quarterback
 Jim Lachey, former Ohio State lineman, retired NFL tackle
 Wally Post, MLB outfielder (deceased)

See also
 Native American mascot controversy
 Sports teams named Redskins

References

External links
 Official St. Henry High School website
 District website
 Official website of the Midwest Athletic Conference

High schools in Mercer County, Ohio
Public high schools in Ohio
1929 establishments in Ohio
Educational institutions established in 1929